Finding Hubby is a 2020 Nigerian romantic drama film directed by Femi Ogunsanwo and starring Ade Laoye, Kehinde Bankole, Munachi Abii, and Charles Etubiebi. It is a screen adaptation of a blog series of the same name written by Tunde Leye. A sequel, Finding Hubby 2, was released in 2021.

Plot 
Oyin Clegg (Ade Laoye)—a 35-year-old marketing executive with a Lagos-based firm—is a successful career woman, but her personal life is a cause for concern for her meddling mother who pressurises her to find a spouse. Although she indulges in one-night stands with eligible men on standby, Oyin is yet to find a suitable partner despite persistence from office colleague Ossy (Charles Etubiebi), the seemingly perfect man with whom Oyin fails to connect. She is pleased when the firm announces their collaboration with Yomi Kester-Jacobs (Paul Utomi), heir to a thriving business empire, but is enraged after the firm denies her the opportunity to travel to the United States for a team-building workshop due to her unmarried status.

During a meeting with her pastor (Tope Tedela) in church, Oyin is reunited with Ade (Efa Iwara), a writer she dated ten years prior before calling time on their relationship due to his dire straits. Their romance is rekindled after she discovers he has now achieved international recognition and wealth, but Oyin is later humiliated when Ade—who now regards Oyin as a gold-digging opportunist—dumps her during a fake proposal in a restaurant as revenge. The incident leaves her depressed until Ossy surprises her with a getaway in Dubai.

At the airport, Oyin runs into Moroti (Omowunmi Dada), an old schoolmate who subtly mocks her single-girl status until Yomi Kester-Jacobs unexpectedly appears and comes to Oyin's rescue by pretending they are a couple. The two travel together, and Ossy, who meets her at the airport upon her return, is horrified to discover his heartthrob has connected with Yomi on holiday. He starts a rebound relationship with Oyin's friend Gloria (Munachi Abii), proposing to her in two weeks. Oyin is initially betrayed but soon recovers and agrees to be chief bridesmaid at their registry wedding.

On the night of her engagement party, Oyin observes Yomi secretly having gay sex. It is here she discovers her fiancé is a closted man using his girlfriend as a social beard to conceal his orientation. Her church minister Pastor T (Tope Tedela) and Toke (Kehinde Bankole)—Oyin's other friend—both suggest she breaks up with him. At the same time, her mother, still eager to see her daughter marry and save the family from shame, encourages her daughter to go through with the marriage, stating her husband's sexuality means she will never worry about female homewreckers. Her mother's pastor (David A. Apemiye) also offers to remedy the situation through prayer. The film ends with Oyin ponding her final decision.

Cast 
 Ade Laoye as Oyin
Munachi Abii as Gloria
 Kehinde Bankole as Toke
 Charles Etubiebi as Ossy
 Efa Iwara as Ade
 Paul Utomi as Yomi
 Tina Mba as Oyin's mum
 Tope Tedela as Pastor T
 Damilola Ogunsi as Desmond
 Omowunmi Dada as Moroti
 Samuel Asa'ah as D.G.
 Demi Banwo as Olumide
 Sammy Eddy as Aminu
 Chris Isibor as Kalu
 Teniola Aladese as Tosan

Production and release 
Finding Hubby is based on a blog series by Tunde Leye, published between April and September 2012. It was released in Nigerian cinemas on 4 December 2020, and released on Netflix on 9 July 2021.

Differences between blog series and film
Some of the characters' names in the blog series were changed for the film (Oyin's ex-boyfriend Femi was renamed Ade; her youth minister 'Hawt' Pastor is Pastor T; Gloria's boyfriend Alvin is Kelvin). In the movie, Oyin first meets Yomi when he rescues her from the condescending Moroti at the airport, but the blog version introduces the reader to Yomi when he strikes up a conversation with Oyin on the flight to Dubai. Kelvin's (Alvin's) secret wife in the blog is British; in the movie she is American. In the blog version, Oyin attempts to reconnect with her occasional bed companion Kalu after discovering her fiancé Yomi is gay; in the film, Kalu is not shown again after their awkward meeting outside the nightclub. The character Desmond was specially created for the film and does not appear in the blog.

Reception 
A Nollywood critic described "Finding Hubby" as "a film that tacitly acknowledges the many spheres of pressure the average young adult dwells in." It was rated 4 out of 10 by the movie reviewer, Martin Cid.

See also
List of Nigerian films of 2020

References

External links

English-language Nigerian films
Nigerian romantic drama films
2020s English-language films
2020 romantic drama films
Nigerian drama films